Aleyna Özkan (born 1 February 2002) is a Turkish swimmer.

She competed in the women's 50 metre butterfly and women's 100 metre butterfly events at the 2018 Mediterranean Games held in Tarragona, Spain. In the same year, she also competed in the girls' 50 metre butterfly, girls' 100 metre butterfly and girls' 200 metre butterfly events at the 2018 Summer Youth Olympics held in Buenos Aires, Argentina.

In 2019, she represented Turkey at the World Aquatics Championships held in Gwangju, South Korea. She competed in the women's 50 metre butterfly and women's 100 metre butterfly events. She also competed in the women's 4 × 100 metre medley relay event.

In 2020, she joined the Duke University swimming and diving team.

References

External links 

Living people
2002 births
Place of birth missing (living people)
Turkish female swimmers
Turkish female butterfly swimmers
Swimmers at the 2018 Summer Youth Olympics
Swimmers at the 2018 Mediterranean Games
Mediterranean Games competitors for Turkey
Islamic Solidarity Games medalists in swimming
Islamic Solidarity Games competitors for Turkey
Duke Blue Devils women's swimmers
21st-century Turkish sportswomen